Karapet or Garabet or Garabed is a common Armenian given name. They may refer to:

a pre-Christian Armenian thunder-god, Karapet

Religion
Karabet or Garabed (Western Armenian), the Armenian name for prodromos, referring to John the Baptist
St. Karapet, a church of the Noravank monastery
Saint Karapet Monastery, at Glak, a 4th-century Armenian monastery
Karapet, a church of the Khtzkonk monastery near Ani
Saint Karapet Church, Tbilisi, Armenian church in Tbilisi, Georgia

Given name

Karapet 
Karapet II of Armenia (died 1729), Catholicos of the Armenian Apostolic Church (1726–1729)
Karapet Chobanyan (born 1927), Armenian scientist
Karapet Karapetyan (born 1982), also known as Karapet Papijan, Armenian-Dutch kickboxer
Karapet Mikaelyan (born 1969), Russia-born Armenian football (soccer) player
Karapet Rubinyan (born 1957), Armenian politician
Karapet Utudjian (1823–1904), Armenian Ottoman journalist, publicist, and writer
Karapetê Xaço (?-2005), Armenian singer of traditional Kurdish dengbêj music
Karapet (bridge player), fictional Armenian expatriate contract bridge player created by Victor Mollo (1909–1987)

Garabed 
Garabed "Chuck" Haytaian (born 1938), American politician of Armenian origin, who was the Speaker of the New Jersey State Assembly
Garabed T. K. Giragossian (20th century), Armenian engineer
Garabed Pashayan Khan (1864–1915), Armenian physician, doctor and public activist
Garo Yepremian (Garabed "Garo" Yepremian) (1944–2015), American football placekicker of Armenian origin

Garabet 
Garabet Amira Balyan (1800–1866), Armenian Ottoman, renowned engineer
Garabet Ibrăileanu (1871–1936), Romanian-Armenian literary critic and theorist, writer, editor, translator, sociologist, professor
Garabet Yazmaciyan (1868–1929), Ottoman painter of Armenian descent

See also
Karapetyan, / Garabedian
Karo (name)
Garo (name)

Armenian masculine given names